Richard E. McLaughlin (December 10, 1915 – June 29, 1993) was a Massachusetts government official who served as Registrar of Motor Vehicles and Commissioner of Public Safety.

McLaughlin was appointed Registrar of Motor Vehicles in 1964 by Governor Endicott Peabody. In 1971, Francis W. Sargent appointed McLaughlin to the newly created post of Secretary of Public Safety. He was also a member of the National Highway Safety Advisory Committee.

After a four-year absence during the Dukakis administration, McLaughlin returned as Registrar of Motor Vehicles under Edward J. King.

References

1993 deaths
People from Cambridge, Massachusetts
American civil servants
Massachusetts Secretaries of Public Safety
1915 births
20th-century American politicians
Massachusetts Registrars of Motor Vehicles